Johan Gustafsson (born 28 February 1992) is a Swedish professional ice hockey goaltender currently playing for Västerås IK of the HockeyAllsvenskan (Allsv).

Playing career
Johan played for Västerås HK in the 2010–11 season, with Luleå HF for the next two seasons and has also played 3 SHL games with Färjestad BK. He was drafted 159th overall by the Minnesota Wild in the 2010 NHL Entry Draft.

After an SHL rookie season where Gustafsson had five shutouts in his first 20 games with Luleå he was nominated for the 2011–12 SHL Rookie of the Year award.

Approaching the deadline to retain Gustafsson rights, the Wild signed Gustafsson to a three-year, entry-level contract in May 2012. He was returned on loan to Luleå for the first year of his contract. In his first North American season, Gustafsson was assigned to American Hockey League affiliate, the Iowa Wild.

Over the duration of his tenure with the Wild, Gustafsson was recalled to the NHL, however never appeared in a game.

On May 4, 2015, as an impending restricted free agent, Gustafsson opted to return to his native Sweden and will play for Frölunda HC of the SHL.

After claiming his second Le Mat Trophy in his four year tenure with Frölunda HC, Gustafsson left the club at the conclusion of his contract upon the end of the 2018–19 Championship winning season.

As a free agent, Gustafsson left Sweden, signing a one-year deal with newly crowned DEL champions, Adler Mannheim, on May 7, 2019.

International play

Gustafsson was Sweden's starting goalie in the 2010 IIHF World U18 Championships where the team won the silver medal. Gustafsson was part of the Gold medal winning Swedish 2013 World Championship team, however was unable to feature in any game.

Career statistics

Regular season and playoffs

International

Awards and honors

References

External links

1992 births
Adler Mannheim players
Alaska Aces (ECHL) players
Färjestad BK players
Frölunda HC players
Iowa Wild players
Living people
Luleå HF players
Minnesota Wild draft picks
People from Köping
Rögle BK players
Swedish ice hockey goaltenders
VIK Västerås HK players
Sportspeople from Västmanland County